Hamidiyeh (also Romanized as Ḩamīdīyeh) is a village in Chashm Rural District, Shahmirzad District, Mehdishahr County, Semnan Province, Iran. At the 2006 census, its population was 17, in 5 families.

References 

Populated places in Mehdishahr County